Shahrjerd (also Romanized as Shahr Jerd; also known as Shahrāgerd, Shahrgerd, and Shahr-ī-Jird) is a village in Masumiyeh Rural District, in the Central District of Arak County, Markazi Province, Iran. At the 2006 census, its population was 390, in 111 families.

References 

Populated places in Arak County